Canelones is the capital of the department of Canelones in Uruguay. Its name is derived from a species of cinnamon, which is called "canelón", growing along the banks of the homonymous river. Since 2010, the city is also the seat of the municipality of Canelones.

Geography
The city is located on Route 5 about  North of Montevideo and on its intersection with Route 64. It lies on the west bank of the river Arroyo Canelón Chico.

History
It was founded on 24 April 1783 under the name "Villa Guadalupe". It became capital of one of the nine earlier Departments of the Republic. The railroad arrived here in 1874, while in 1908 National Route 5 from Montevideo was inaugurated. On 23 March 1916, it was renamed to "Canelones" and its status was elevated to "Ciudad" (city) by the Act of Ley Nº 5.400.

Population
According to the 2011 census, Canelones had a population of 19,865. In 2010, the Intendencia de Canelones had recorded a population of 25,961 for the municipality during the elections. While Canelones is the capital of the department of the same name, it has a considerably smaller population compared with two other cities in the department, Ciudad de la Costa and Las Piedras.

 
Source: Instituto Nacional de Estadística de Uruguay

Economic activity
The city and the department have numerous small to large vineyards and wineries. In 1987 the cold-storage facility "Frigorífico Canelones" was founded, which ever since became the principal industry of the city.

Government and infrastructure
The civil aviation agency of the country, National Civil Aviation and Aviation Infrastructure Direction (DINACIA), has its headquarters in Canelones.

Places of worship
Cathedral of Our Lady of Guadalupe (Roman Catholic)

Noted local people
 Diego Lugano, captain of the Uruguay national football team
 Pablo Gabriel García, football player for PAOK F.C.
 Matías Vecino, footballer
 Facundo Peraza (born July 27, 1992), footballer
 Robert Siboldi, Former football player and former manager of Santos Laguna
 Sebastián Rodríguez (born 1992), footballer
 Andrea Trujillo, Director of Nursing, Perfect Survey Champion

Sister Cities 
 Asunción, Paraguay

See also

 Canelones Department#Main Urban Centres

References

External links
INE map of Canelones, Paso Espinosa and Paso Palomeque

 
Populated places in the Canelones Department
Populated places established in 1782
1782 establishments in the Viceroyalty of the Río de la Plata